In Greek mythology, Eurryroe (Ancient Greek: Εùρυῥῤόης) was the daughter of the Egyptian river-god Nilus, thus she can be considered as a naiad. According to Hippostratus, Eurryroe was said to be the mother alone of the 50 sons of King Aegyptus of Egypt. Her sister Europa, also bore the Libyan king Danaus's 50 daughters. Otherwise, Aegyptus's children were bore to different mothers including Argyphia, Tyria, the naiad Caliadne, Gorgo and Hephaestine.

Notes

References 

 Apollodorus, The Library with an English Translation by Sir James George Frazer, F.B.A., F.R.S. in 2 Volumes, Cambridge, MA, Harvard University Press; London, William Heinemann Ltd. 1921. ISBN 0-674-99135-4. Online version at the Perseus Digital Library. Greek text available from the same website.
 Tzetzes, John, Book of Histories, Book VII-VIII translated by Vasiliki Dogani from the original Greek of T. Kiessling's edition of 1826. Online version at theio.com

Naiads